Orland Township may refer to:

 Orland Township, Cook County, Illinois
 Orland Township, Lake County, South Dakota, in Lake County, South Dakota

Township name disambiguation pages